Dětřichov u Moravské Třebové is a municipality and village in Svitavy District in the Pardubice Region of the Czech Republic. It has about 200 inhabitants.

History
The first written mention of Dětřichov u Moravské Třebové is from 1321. The originally Slavic settlement was gradually settled by Germans.

During the World War II, the municipality was annexed by Nazi Germany. A small concentration camp for pregnant forced laborers was established there. After the war, the German population was expelled.

References

Villages in Svitavy District